South Korea competed at the 2022 World Games held in Birmingham, United States from 7 to 17 July 2022. Athletes representing South Korea won one gold medal, three silver medals and four bronze medals. The country finished in 34th place in the medal table.

Medalists

Invitational sports

Air sports

South Korea competed in drone racing.

Archery

South Korea competed in archery.

Bowling

South Korea won one bronze medal in bowling.

Cue sports

South Korea competed in cue sports.

Finswimming

South Korea won four medals in finswimming.

Muaythai

South Korea competed in muaythai.

Racquetball

South Korea competed in racquetball.

Rhythmic gymnastics

South Korea competed in rhythmic gymnastics.

Water skiing

South Korea competed in water skiing.

Wushu

South Korea won three medals in wushu.

References

Nations at the 2022 World Games
2022
World Games